"Revival's in the Air" is a song by Bethel Music and Melissa Helser, which was released as the fifth single from Bethel Music's twelfth live album, Revival's in the Air (2020), on September 4, 2020. The song was written by Jonathan David Helser, Melissa Helser, Cadence Helser. David Leonard, Brad King, and Seth Talley handled the production of the single.

Background
On May 28, 2020, Bethel Music released "Revival's in the Air" as the fourth and final promotional single from the Revival's in the Air, along with the song's accompanying live music video. Melissa Helser shared the story behind of the song, saying: 
The studio-recorded version of "Revival's in the Air" was released in digital format on September 4, 2020. The song then impacted Christian radio in the United States on September 25, 2020.

Composition

Commercial performance
"Revival's in the Air" debuted at number 41 on the US Christian Airplay chart. The song went on to peak at number 30 and has spent a total of nine non-consecutive weeks on the chart.

Music videos
Bethel Music released the live music video of "Revival's in the Air" with Melissa Helser leading the song at Bethel Church through their YouTube channel on May 28, 2020.

Charts

Release history

References

External links
  on PraiseCharts

2020 singles
2020 songs
Bethel Music songs